Daniel Gibbs (born 8 January 1968 in Saint-Martin) is a French Saint-Martinois politician.

Political career 
In 2011, he founded Union for Democracy.

He was elected MP to the French National Assembly on 17 June 2012 representing the constituency of Saint Barthélemy and Saint-Martin. In 2017, he succeeded Aline Hanson as President of the Overseas Collectivity of St. Martin.

In the 2022 Saint Martin Territorial Council election, he sought a second term in office but was defeated by Louis Mussington. He once again contested the constituency of Saint Barthélemy and Saint-Martin in the 2022 election but was defeated by LREM candidate Frantz Gumbs.

References

1968 births
Living people
Deputies of the 14th National Assembly of the French Fifth Republic
Presidents of the Territorial Council of Saint Martin
Members of the Territorial Council of Saint Martin
Union for Democracy (Saint Martin) politicians
Black French politicians
Members of Parliament for Saint Barthélemy and Saint Martin